Sofiane Pamart is a French pianist, based in Paris and originally from Hellemmes in the suburbs of Lille. He is known to the French public for breaking the elitist codes of classical piano.

As a gold medallist at the Conservatoire de Lille, he took a different track to the typical classical music path. Alongside his solo career, he is renowned as a go-to pianist in the French rap scene. He has had numerous collaborations with French rappers, including Koba LaD, Vald, Maes, Sneazzy, Hugo TSR, Scylla, Lord Esperanza, Frenetik and Dinos.

In 2019, he had two singles certified Gold, both as a songwriter: for "Matin" by Koba LaD ft. Maes; and for "Journal Perso II" by Vald. The albums that both singles appeared on also achieved Gold status.

Sofiane Pamart is partly of Moroccan Berber descent, from Taroudant.

Discography

As principal artist 
 Pleine Lune (2018)
 Pleine Lune 2 (2019)
 Planet (2019)
 Planet Gold (2020)
 Borealis (2021)
 Letter (2022)

As collaborator 
2018: Médine - Storyteller

2019: Koba LaD - L'Affranchi

2019: Vald - Ce monde est cruel

2019: Naar - Safar

2020: Isha - La Vie Augmente, Vol.3

2020: Dinos - Taciturne

2020: Laylow - Trinity

2021: Arno - Vivre

Honours 
2018: Ambassador for Salon du Luxe Paris
2019: Gold Single for the composition of "Matin" - Koba LaD ft. Maes
2019: Gold Single for the composition of "Journal Perso II" - Vald

References 

21st-century French male pianists
21st-century French composers
Year of birth missing (living people)
Living people